First Survey is a supplement published under license by Imperium Games in 1996 for Game Designers Workshop's science fiction role-playing game Traveller.

Publication history
First Survey is a 112-page softcover book designed by Duane Maxwell, Steve Miller, and David Wise, with illustrations by Steve Bryant and Bryan Gibson, and cover art by Chris Foss. The book has two computer-generated lists — one for the gamemaster, and the other for the players — that contain data on over 10,000 planets in the Traveller universe. The data included each planet's name, its location, type of government, level of law, and its terrain type.

Due to a programming error, the data on type of government and law level was incorrect.

Reception
In the January 1998 edition of Dragon (Issue #243), Rick Swan was not impressed with the supplied data on each planet, calling it "sparse to the point of non-existence." He conceded that the sparseness was intentional, so that gamemasters could fill in the details for their own Traveller campaigns. But Swan objected to the entire concept of the book, pointing out the relatively high cost of the book ($23 in 1998), and saying "any experienced gamemaster ought to be able to cook up a perfectly adequate list of planets all by his lonesome." He concluded by giving the book a very poor rating of only 2 stars out of 6. 

In his 2014 book Designers & Dragons, Shannon Appelcline commented that "First Survey (1996), the final book copyrighted 1996, was probably the worst (and ugliest) book published for the game system. It contained 112 pages of computer-generated statistics for all the worlds of the Imperium in Milieu 0, laid out in unattractive row after row. There were two copies of all the stats: one for players, and one for the gamemaster, making the book that much more redundant. Worse, due to an error in programming, every single planet's Universal World Profile (UWP) was wrong. The fifth and sixth digits of each UWP — which represented the government and law level of the planet — were all identical."

Reviews
Arcane #19 (May, 1997)
Shadis #37 (1997)

References

Role-playing game supplements introduced in 1996
Traveller (role-playing game) supplements